The 2006 Mr. Olympia contest was an IFBB professional bodybuilding competition and the feature event of Joe Weider's 2006 Olympia Weekend held September 29–30, 2006 at the Orleans Arena in Las Vegas, Nevada.

Results

The total prize money for the Mr. Olympia contest was increased from $480,000 to $546,000.

Notable events

Jay Cutler, after finishing 2nd place in four previous Mr Olympia contests, wins his first title
Ronnie Coleman, after eight consecutive wins, is defeated and remains tied with Lee Haney for most Mr. Olympia titles

See also
 2006 Ms. Olympia

References

External links 
 Mr. Olympia
 Press Release: Joe Weider's 2006 Olympia Weekend

 2006
Mr. Olympia 2006
2006 in bodybuilding
Mr. Olympia
Mr. Olympia 2006